Milligan is a surname of Scottish and Irish origin, coming from the Irish Ó Maolagain literally meaning "grandson of the bald man".
Notable people with the surname include:

People

A–H
 Alexander William Milligan (1858–1921), Australian ornithologist
 Alice Milligan (1865–1953), Irish nationalist and poet
 Andy Milligan (1929–1991), American playwright, screenwriter, and film director
 Billy Milligan (1955–2014), noted sufferer of multiple personality disorder
 Blanche Margaret Milligan (fl. early 20th century), American author
 Bonnie Milligan, musical theater performer and television actor
 Brent Milligan, American record producer and bass guitar player
 Catherine Jean Milligan (born 1986), 2006 Miss Northern Ireland
 Chic Milligan (Charles Campbell Milligan; born 1930), Scottish footballer
 Chris Milligan (born 1988), Australian actor
 Clarence Milligan (1904–1993), Canadian politician, member of the House of Commons of Canada (1957–1962)
 Cynthia H. Milligan (born 1947), American businesswoman
 Deanna Milligan (born 1972), Canadian actress
 Dennis Milligan (born 1957), State Treasurer of Arkansas (from 2015)
 Dolphus E. Milligan (1928–1973), American chemist
 Dudley Milligan (1916–1971), South African and Irish footballer
 Dustin Milligan (born 1985), Canadian film and television actor
 Edward H. Milligan (born 1922), Quaker historian
 Eric Milligan (politician) (fl. 1990s and 2000s), Scottish politician
 Eric Milligan (rugby union) (born 1981), Scottish rugby union player
 Frank Milligan (1870–1900), English cricketer
 Fraser Milligan (born 1989), Scottish footballer
 George Milligan (disambiguation)
 Gladys Milligan (1892–1973), American painter
 Hamin Milligan (born 1978), Arena Football League player
 Hanik Milligan (born 1979), American football player
 Harold Vincent Milligan (born 1888), Stephen Foster biographer and composer
 Helen Milligan (born 1962), Scottish-New Zealand chess player
 Henry Milligan (born 1958), American boxer

J–Z
 Jacob L. Milligan (1889–1951), United States Representative from Missouri (1920–1921, 1923–1935)
 James Milligan (born 1978), Australian politician
 Jamie Milligan (born 1980), English footballer
 Jocko Milligan, born John Milligan (1861–1923), Major League Baseball player
 John Milligan (disambiguation)
 Joseph Milligan (born 1980), member of American alternative rock band Anberlin
 Keith Milligan (born 1950), Prince Edward Island politician
 Kelly Milligan (born 1961), American Olympic cross-country skier
 Lambdin P. Milligan (1812–1899) Lawyer and Confederate sympathizer
 Louise Milligan, Australian journalist
 Luke Milligan (born 1976), a former tennis player from the United Kingdom
 Malford Milligan (born 1959), American soul, blues and gospel singer
 Mark Milligan (born 1985), Australian footballer
 Maurice M. Milligan (1884–1959), U.S. District Attorney for Western Missouri
 Mike Milligan (disambiguation)
 Mollie Milligan (fl. 1999–), American actress
 Paddy Milligan (Samuel Risk Milligan; 1916–2001), Irish greyhound trainer
 Peter Milligan (born 1961), graphic novelist
 Randy Milligan (born 1961), a former professional baseball player
 Rob Milligan (politician) (born 1971), Canadian politician
 Rob Milligan (rugby union) (born 1990), British rugby union player
 Robert Milligan (footballer) (1892–1915), Scottish footballer
 Robert Milligan (merchant) (1746–1809), Scottish merchant and ship-owner
 Robert Milligan (politician) (1786–1862), English politician
 Rolan Milligan (born 1994), American football safety
 Samuel Milligan (1814–1874), American attorney
 Spencer Milligan (fl. 1970s and 1980s), American actor
 Spike Milligan (1918–2002), comedian, writer and actor
 Stephen Milligan (1948–1994), British politician
 Stuart Milligan (born 1953), American actor
 Tommy Milligan (1904–1970), Scottish welter/middleweight boxer of the 1920s
 Tony Milligan (born 1966), Scottish philosopher
 William Milligan (disambiguation)

Fictional characters 
 Adam Milligan, a minor character in the show Supernatural
 Bruno Milligan, a character in the television series Footballers' Wives
 Lori Milligan, a character in the film The Final Destination
 Lucy Milligan, a character in the television series Footballers' Wives
 Owen Milligan, a character in the Degrassi series
 Rex Milligan, a fictional character created by Anthony Buckeridge

See also
 
 Mulligan (surname)

Scottish surnames
Anglicised Irish-language surnames
English-language surnames